The 1994 Waltham Forest Council election took place on 5 May 1994 to elect members of Waltham Forest London Borough Council in London, England. The whole council was up for election and the council went into no overall control.

Background

Election result

|}

Ward results

References

1994
1994 London Borough council elections